Benjamin Tett (1798-May 15, 1878) was an Ontario businessman and political figure. He represented Leeds South as a Conservative member of the 1st Parliament of Ontario.

He was born in Somerset in England in 1798, the son of John Tett who manufactured cloth for ships' sails, and came to Perth, Upper Canada in 1820, later moving to Newboro. He served on the district council of the Johnstown District representing North Crosby. Around 1830, he set up a sawmill north of Kingston at Bedford Mills, anticipating the completion of the Rideau Canal. In partnership with the Chaffey family and others, he established a booming timber business in the area. He also constructed a gristmill and opened a general store. In 1833, he married Julianna Poole. Tett ran unsuccessfully in Leeds for a seat in the legislative assembly of Upper Canada in 1838. He was again unsuccessful when he ran for the South Leeds seat in the Legislative Assembly of the Province of Canada in 1854 but went on to represent South Leeds in the assembly from 1858 to 1863. In 1863, he was defeated by Albert Norton Richards for the same seat. Tett also served as a justice of the peace.

His daughter Elizabeth married doctor Robert Henry Preston, who later represented South Leeds in the provincial assembly. His great-grandson John Tett is the namesake of Kingston's Tett Centre for Creativity and Learning.

External links 
 History of Leeds and Grenville, Thaddeus William Henry Leavitt
The Canadian parliamentary companion : first year HJ Morgan (1862)
Member's parliamentary history for the Legislative Assembly of Ontario

1798 births
1878 deaths
Progressive Conservative Party of Ontario MPPs
Members of the Legislative Assembly of the Province of Canada from Canada West
Pre-Confederation Canadian businesspeople
English emigrants to pre-Confederation Ontario
People from Somerset
People from Leeds and Grenville United Counties
Immigrants to Upper Canada